White Fields is the first album by rock band The Escape Club, issued in 1986.

Track listing
 "The Push"
 "Sound of the City"
 "Fall"
 "Where Angels Cry"
 "I Will Be There"
 "Blood and Water"
 "The Hard Way"
 "White Fields"
 "Rescue Me"
 "Slow Train"

The Escape Club albums
EMI Records albums
1986 debut albums
Albums produced by Scott Litt